The 2012 Copa Libertadores Femenina was the fourth edition of the Copa Libertadores Femenina, CONMEBOL's premier annual international women's football club tournament. São José were the defending champions.

Colo Colo won the title after a penalty shootout in the final, and became the first non-Brazilian team to win the tournament. The topscorer award was given to Cristiane for a second time and the best player award was won by Karen Araya from Colo Colo.

On 28 September 2012 it was confirmed that all matches were to be played in the state of Pernambuco, Brazil.

Qualification and format
The format is the same as in 2011 with twelve teams being divided in three groups of four teams. The group winners and best second-placed team advance to the semi-finals.

Venues
Three cities host matches in this year's edition: Recife, Vitória and Caruaru.

First stage
The group winner and the best runners-up advanced to the semifinals. The draw was held on 9 October 2012.  A list of fixtures was announced on 10 October 2012.

Tie-breaker in case of equal points is:
 Goal difference
 Goals scored
 Match between tied teams
If still tied the organisers may decide how to proceed. In case two team are tied after having played each other the last matchday, the tie is decided by a penalty shootout.

All times are Brasília time, UTC-03.

Group A
Group A is played in Recife.

Group B
Group B is played in Caruaru.

Group C
Group C is played in Vitória de Santo Antão.

Ranking of second place-finishers
In the ranking of group runners-ups all matches do count towards the ranking.

Final stages

Per draw Group A and B winners met with the best second-place finisher meeting Group C winner in the semi-finals. Should however two Brazilian teams advance to the semi-finals, those two would play each other regardless.

Semifinals

Third-place match

Final

Top goalscorers

References

External links
Official website
Tournament at soccerway.com

2012
2012 in women's association football
2012 in South American football
Lib
International club association football competitions hosted by Brazil
International women's association football competitions hosted by Brazil